Elisa Carlota Corredera Llauger (born in Vigo, Spain, 21 July 1974), better known as Carlota Corredera, is a Spanish presenter, director, television collaborator, and journalist, known for having directed several Telecinco programs.

Biography 
She graduated in journalism at the University of Santiago de Compostela in 1997; from that moment, she was linked to the newspaper La Voz de Galicia. Her television career began at en Antena 3, where she became deputy director of Ana Rosa Quintana's program Sabor a Ti in 2003.

Afterwards, she moved to Telecinco to direct programs such as TNT, El laberinto de la memoria, and Hormigas blancas. In 2009, she was given the opportunity to direct Sálvame and Sálvame Deluxe. In the latter, she stayed until 2013.

She became a collaborator of Abre los ojos y mira in 2013, and she began working as a substitute presenter of Sálvame in 2014.In the summer of that same year, she was a collaborator in Hable con ellas and presented the docurreality Las Campos. At the end of 2016, it was announced she would sign as the new presenter of Cámbiame from 9 January 2017.

On 18 May 2017, her first book, called On 18 May 2017, her first book, called "Tú también puedes: Cómo conseguí perder 60 kilos y ganar salud".<ref>{{Cite web |last=Ruiz |first=Rosa Villacastín Fotos: Ana |date=17 May 2017 |title=Carlota Corredera: Mi marido nunca me hizo sentirme mal por mi peso" |url=http://www.diezminutos.es/famosos-corazon/famosos-espanoles/interviews/g15903/carlota-corredera-libro/|website=Diez Minutos |language=es}}</ref> She released her second book, called "Hablemos de nosotras" at the end of 2019.

In 2021, she began presenting the documentary series debate Rocío, contar la verdad para seguir viva. Television 

 Television programs 

 As a director 

 As a presenter 

 As a collaborator 

 As a contestant 

 Television series 

 Personal life 
Carlota got married on 15 June 2013 to Carlos de la Maza, cameraman of the program Sálvame. On 22 June 2015, she gave birth to her only daughter, Alba.

 Books 

 Tú también puedes (Memorias, Ed. Grijalbo, 2017) ISBN 9788416895144.
 Hablemos de nosotras'' (Reflexiones, Ed. Grijalbo, 2019) ISBN 9788417752019.

Awards 

 Awarded the title of "distinguished Viguesa" in 2020.
 For her work as a presenter, she received the Alcazaba Awards 2021 Communication and Creation Award.
 The Chicote Award for the best female communicator.
 The Government Delegation of the Community of Madrid bestows the Meninas 2021 Award on her for her "commitment to the defense of equality and against male violence."
 The Paloma de Plata XXI Award.

References

External links 
 Carlota Corredera on IMDb

Spanish television presenters
1974 births
Living people